The 2016 FIM Sidecarcross World Championship, the 37th edition of the competition, started on 10 April and finished after eleven events on 18 September 2016.

The championship was won by Belgian rider Jan Hendrickx and his Dutch passenger Ben van den Bogaart. For Hendrickx it was the first title while van den Bogaart won his third, having previously been World Champion as passenger of Ben Adriaenssen in 2013 and 2014. Adriaenssen, with passenger Lauris Daiders, finished second, 43 points behind while British riders Stuart Brown and Josh Chamberlain came third.

The defending champions were Etienne Bax from the Netherlands and his Latvian passenger Kaspars Stupelis, winning their first-ever World Championship together in  2015, also Stupelis had been World Champion twice before with Daniël Willemsen in 2003 and 2004. Bax did however not race with Stupelis in 2016, having instead chosen his brother Robbie Bax as passenger for the season.

The Sidecarcross World Championship, first held in 1980 and organised by the Fédération Internationale de Motocyclisme, is an annual competition. All races, manufacturers and the vast majority of riders in the competition being in and from Europe. Sidecarcross is similar to motocross except that the teams consist of two riders, a driver and a passenger. Races are held on the same tracks as solo motocross but the handling of the machines differs as sidecars do not lean. The majority of physical work in the sport is carried out by the passenger, who speeds up the sidecarcross in corners by leaning out. The coordination between the driver and the passenger are therefore of highest importance.

Overview
The eleven Grands Prix of the season were held in eight countries; Germany held three events and the Netherlands held two, while France, Switzerland, Latvia, Czech Republic, Belgium and Estonia hosted one event. In comparison to 2015 the season was reduced from 15 to 11 events. France lost two events while Switzerland and Latvia lost one and Spain was dropped off the calendar altogether. Ukraine, who had its 2014 and 2015 Grand Prix cancelled because of political events, had originally scheduled an event but this was later moved to Germany.

Format

Every Grand Prix weekend was split into two races, both held on the same day. This meant that the 2016 season, with its eleven Grands Prix will have 22 races. Each race lasted for 30 minutes plus two laps. The points scored over the races were combined to determine an overall winner. In case of a tie, the results of the second race were used to determine the winner. While this overall winner received no extra world championship points, they usually were awarded a special trophy. Race start times were set at 13:30 and 16:00.

Events typically consisted of a qualifying competition, held in multiple stages on Saturdays of a race weekend while the two race events were typically held on Sundays. One exception to this rule was Easter weekends, when the races were held on Easter Monday. Race weekends could consist of additional motocross or quart support races as well, but the FIM stipulated that the World Championship races have priority. Riders had to be provided with at least one 30 minute free practice season, which was timed. A race could consist of up to 30 starters and the qualifying modus was dependent on the number of entries. Up to 32 entries, it was held in one group split into two sessions of 30 minutes each. Above 32 entries, the starter field was sub-divided into two groups through ballot and the current standings. Each qualifying group could consist of up to 30 racers. Should there be more than 60 entries, a pre-qualifying had to be held. Of the riders in the two groups, the top-twelve directly qualified for the races. The remaining teams then go to a second-chance qualifying, in which the best six advanced. The riders placed seventh and eighth remained in reserve should one of the qualified teams be unable to participate.

The FIM stipulated that all drivers and passengers must be at least 16 years old to compete, with the minimum age of drivers having come down from 18 in previous seasons, but no older than 50. Riders older than 50 had to provide a certificate of medical fitness to be permitted to compete. The driver had the right to exchange his passenger under certain conditions.

The engines permitted in the competition in 2015 were 2-stroke from 350 to 750 cc or 4-stroke up to 1,000 cc.

Starting numbers for the season were awarded according to the previous season's overall finishing position of the driver. Current or former World Champions had however the right to pick any number they wished, except the number one which was reserved for the current World Champion.

The competition was open for motor cycles with two-stroke engines from between 350 and 750cc and four-stroke engines of up to 1,000cc. Each team was permitted the use of two motorcycles with the possibility of changing machines between races.

The FIM did not permit radio communication between riders and their teams. Outside assistance during the race on the course was not permitted unless it was through race marshals in the interest of safety. Limited repairs in the designated repair zone during the race were permitted.

The first twenty teams of each race scored competition points. The point system for the 2016 season will be as follows:

Prize money
In 2016 prize money will be awarded to all riders scoring points, with €300 going to each race winner, €250 to the runners-up, gradually declining from there, with €50 going to all teams placed 12th to 20th. Additionally, every team qualified for the race plus the two reserve teams received €500 in travel compensation.

Calendar
The calendar for the 2016 season:

Classification
The top ten teams in the final standings:

References

External links
 The World Championship on Sidecarcross.com
 FIM Sidecar Motocross World Championship

Sidecarcross World Championship seasons
Sidecarcross world championship